Route 7 is a national route of Uruguay. In 1981, it was assigned the name General Aparicio Saravia, a national hero of Uruguay. It connects Montevideo with Melo in the northeast. The road is approximately 387 kilometres in length.

The distance notation along Route 5 uses the same Kilometre Zero reference as Routes 1, 3, 5, 6, 8, 9 and IB, which is the Pillar of Peace of Plaza de Cagancha in the Centro of Montevideo.

References

External links
Viajando Por Uruguay, Rutas del Uruguay. Hoy; Ruta 7

Roads in Uruguay